Ağıllar is a village in the district Bafra, Samsun Province, Turkey. It is 5 kilometers away from Bafra and 55 kilometers to Samsun. Its population was 401 by 2019.

References 

Bafra
Villages in Samsun Province